Tozlu is a  small village in Erdemli district of Mersin Province, Turkey. The village is situated in the Toros Mountains and in summers it is used as a summer resort so called yayla. The winter (settled) population of Tozlu was only 50 as of 2012. However the during summers population may increase up to 1000. Economy of the permanent settlers depends on farming. Apple, plum and cherry are the main crops.

References

Villages in Erdemli District